Franziska Rochat-Moser (17 August 1966 – 7 March 2002) was a long-distance runner from Switzerland, who represented her native country at two consecutive Summer Olympics, starting in 1992. She won the 1997 New York City Marathon.

Moser was married to Philippe Rochat, renowned chef and owner of a prominent French restaurant. She died in an avalanche while climbing in the Swiss Alps.

Achievements

References
 

1966 births
2002 deaths
Swiss female marathon runners
People from Oberaargau District
Athletes (track and field) at the 1992 Summer Olympics
Athletes (track and field) at the 1996 Summer Olympics
Olympic athletes of Switzerland
New York City Marathon female winners
Deaths in avalanches
Mountaineering deaths
Natural disaster deaths in Switzerland
Frankfurt Marathon female winners
Sportspeople from the canton of Bern